The  A2 Highway is a trunk road in Ethiopia. It connects the capital Addis Ababa with Mekelle, as well as with Wukro, Adigrat, Axum, Shire and Humera.

Route 
Towns and cities along the A2 include, from north to south:
 Humera
 Sheraro, connection to Badme (Eritrea)
 Adi Dairo
 Shire – , connection to (south) Inda Aba Guna, May Tsebri and Debarq; (west) Kisad Gaba, Mayhansse, Dedebit and Addi Remets
 Selekleka or Seleh Leha – 
 Wkro or Wukro Maray
 Axum – 
 Adwa-Adi Abun – , connection to (south) Abi Addi and (north) Rama
 Enticho – , connection to Yeha
 Bizet – 
 Adigrat – , connection to Zalambessa, FatsiSebeya and Asmara (Eritrea)
 Idaga Hamus – 
 Freweyni – , connection to Hawzen and Nebelet
 Negash – 
 Wukro – , connection to Atsbi
 Agula – , connection to Berhale (Afar)
 Maymekden – , connection to Mekelle, Hagre Selam and Abi Addi
 Kwiha – , connection to Mekelle and Abala
 Adi Gudem – 
 Alagi Pass – 
 Ambalage – 
 Alege Pass – 
 Maychew – , connection to Mekoni
 Korem – 
 Alamata – , connection to Mekoni
 Kobo – , connection to Lalibela
 Woldiya – , connection to Gashena, Lalibela, Debre Tabor, Bahir Dar and Gondar.
 Mersa
 Wichale
 Dessie – 
 Kombolcha, connection to Afar
 Debre Sina – 
 Debre Sina Tunnel (length – , elevation – 
 Debre Birhan – 
 Addis Abeba –

Mountain passes 
There are three high-mountain passes on the A2:
 Between Ambalage and Adi Gudem over the Alagi pass near Amba Alagi at a height of 3090 meters.
 Between Maychew and Ambalage over the Alage pass at a height of 2990 meters.
 Just west of Debre Sina, the national highway reaches its apex at 3120 meters, formerly the Passo Mussolini. A tunnel was constructed by the Italian occupants near the top of the pass.

The highway crosses the continental divide twice: once at Debre Sina and another time over the Alage pass north of Maychew.

Mekelle 
Mekelle, the capital of the Tigray region, is located ten kilometers off the highway. A large road turns off to Mekelle at Kwiha, the center of the Enderta district. The detour to Mekelle adds thirteen kilometers. To follow the A2 to the north and get to Wukro, Adigrat and further more directly, one has to turn off in Kwiha and follow the road which crosses the plateau east of Mekelle. the A2 joins the Mekelle road detour at the village of Maimekden.

Railway 
In the plans for a new Ethiopian railroad network, a railroad would be constructed from Addis Ababa to Mekelle, Shire and then to Humera roughly following the route of the A2.

Roads in Ethiopia